This is a list of films based on Germanic mythology.

Beowulf

Gesta Danorum

Household and nature spirits

Kraken

Mother Hulda

Nibelungenlied

Norse pantheon

Marvel's Thor

Ragnar Lodbrok

Trolls and jötnar

Völsung and Nibelung tradition

See also 
List of films based on Greco-Roman mythology
List of films based on Slavic mythology
Norse mythology in popular culture

References 

Germanic mythology